The 1930 Toledo Rockets football team was an American football team that represented Toledo University in the Northwest Ohio League (NOL) during the 1930 college football season. In their first season under head coach Jim Nicholson, the Rockets compiled a 2–5–1 record. Don Sharp was the team captain.  The team played its home games at University Stadium (Scott Park) in Toledo, Ohio.

Schedule

References

Toledo
Toledo Rockets football seasons
Toledo Rockets football